The 1987–88 FA Trophy was the nineteenth season of the FA Trophy.

First qualifying round

Ties

Replays

2nd replays

3rd replay

Second qualifying round

Ties

Replays

2nd replay

Third qualifying round

Ties

Replays

2nd replay

1st round

Ties

Replays

2nd replays

2nd round

Ties

Replays

3rd round

Ties

Replays

2nd replay

3rd replay

4th round

Ties

Replays

Semi finals

First leg

Second leg

Replay

2nd replay

Final

Tie

Replay

References

General
 Football Club History Database: FA Trophy 1987-88

Specific

1987–88 domestic association football cups
League
1987-88